Marginodostomia is a genus of very small sea snails, pyramidellid gastropod mollusks or micromollusks.

Species
 Marginodostomia abnorma (Nomura, 1937)
 Marginodostomia charpenteri (Hornung & Mermod, 1924)
 Marginodostomia misakiensis (Nomura, 1939)
 Marginodostomia prava (Saurin, 1962)
 Marginodostomia striatissima Robba, Di Geronimo, Chaimanee, Negri & Sanfilippo, 2004
 Marginodostomia subangulata (A. Adams, 1860)
 Marginodostomia suturamarginata Nomura, 1936
Species brought into synonymy
 Marginodostomia hilgendorfi(Clessin, 1900): synonym of Odostomia hilgendorfi Clessin, 1900
 Marginodostomia improbabilis (Oberling, 1970): synonym of Odostomia improbabilis Oberling, 1970
 Marginodostomia pseudoperforata (Nomura, 1939): synonym of Megastomia pseudoperforata (Nomura, 1939)
 Marginodostomia tenera (A. Adams, 1860): synonym of Megastomia tenera (A. Adams, 1860)
 Marginodostomia verduini (Van Aartsen, 1987): synonym of Odostomia improbabilis Oberling, 1970

References

 Van Aartsen J. J. & Corgan J. X (1999); Review of Cyclodostomia Sacco, 1892 AND Marginodostomia Nomura, 1936, Two Taxa of the Pyramidellacea (Gastropoda: Heterobranchia); Basteria 1999, vol. 63, no. 1-3, pp. 61–68;   ISSN  0005-6219

Pyramidellidae
Molluscs described in 1936